Relations between Vietnam and China (pinyin: Zhōng-Yuè Guān Xì) have been back and forth for thousands of years. Despite their Sinospheric and socialist background, centuries of conquest by modern China's imperial predecessor have made Vietnam wary of the Chinese government. Although China assisted North Vietnam during the Vietnam War, relations between the two nations soured following Fall of Saigon in 1975 and Vietnamese reunification in 1976. The root cause was the Vietnamese ouster of the Khmer Rouge, which had become genocidal, from power in Cambodia, a party that China had propped up. China invaded Vietnam in 1979, beginning the Sino-Vietnamese War. Cross-border raids and skirmishes ensued, in which China and Vietnam fought a prolonged border war from 1979 to 1990. Both sides have since worked to improve their diplomatic and economic ties, although the two countries remain in dispute over political and territorial issues in the South China Sea (or East Sea). China and Vietnam share a  border as well. In 2014, a survey conducted by the Pew Research Center showed 84% of Vietnamese were concerned that disputes relating to the South China Sea could lead to military conflict. However, the two countries have been striving for restraint as well as present and future stability. The two countries' political parties, although having faced a number of concerns, have since maintained socialist ties.

History

Early history

China and Vietnam had contact since the Chinese Warring States period and the Vietnamese Thục dynasty in the 3rd century BC (disputed), as noted in the 15th-century Vietnamese historical record Đại Việt sử ký toàn thư. Between the 1st century BC and the 15th century AD, Vietnam was subject to four separate periods of imperial Chinese domination although it successfully asserted a degree of independence after the Battle of Bạch Đằng in 938 AD.

According to the old Vietnamese historical records Đại Việt sử ký toàn thư and Khâm Định Việt Sử Thông Giám Cương Mục, An Dương Vương (Thục Phán) was a prince of the Chinese state of Shu (蜀, which shares the same Chinese character as his surname Thục), sent by his father first to explore what are now the southern Chinese provinces of Guangxi and Yunnan and then to move their people to what is now northern Vietnam during the invasion of the Qin dynasty.

Some modern Vietnamese scholars believe that Thục Phán came upon Âu Việt, which is now northernmost Vietnam, western Guangdong, and southern Guangxi Province, with its capital in what is today Cao Bằng Province). After assembling an army, he defeated Hùng Vương XVIII, the last ruler of the Hồng Bàng dynasty, in 258 BC. He proclaimed himself An Dương Vương ("King An Dương"), renamed his newly acquired state from Văn Lang to Âu Lạc and established the new capital at Phong Khê (now Phú Thọ, a town in northern Vietnam), where he tried to build Cổ Loa Citadel, the spiral fortress approximately ten miles north of his new capital.

Han Chinese migration into Vietnam has been dated back to the era of the 2nd century BC, when Qin Shi Huang first placed northern Vietnam under Chinese rule (disputed), Chinese soldiers and fugitives from Central China have migrated en masse into northern Vietnam since then and introduced Chinese influences into Vietnamese culture. The Chinese military leader Zhao Tuo founded the Triệu dynasty, which ruled Nanyue in southern China and northern Vietnam. The Qin governor of Canton advised Zhao to found his own independent kingdom since the area was remote, and there were many Chinese settlers in the area. The Chinese prefect of Jiaozhi, Shi Xie, ruled Vietnam as an autonomous warlord and was posthumously deified by later Vietnamese emperors. Shi Xie was the leader of the elite ruling class of Han Chinese families that immigrated to Vietnam and played a major role in developing Vietnam's culture.

Imperial period
After Vietnam gained its independence in 939, a series of wars between China and Vietnam occurred in which Vietnam, at its peak, invaded China once, during the Lý–Song War, which the Lý dynasty raided into China and even occupied several counties in what is now Guangxi and Guangdong, in China. That would be the major factor for the later conflict between China and Vietnam. The Ming dynasty invaded Vietnam and occupied it in what would be the Fourth Era of Northern Domination, only to be defeated 20 years later by the army of rebel leader Lê Lợi, who later founded the Later Lê dynasty in Vietnam. The Qing dynasty had also attempted to reinstall the last Lê emperor on the throne as a puppet but was defeated by Emperor Quang Trung at 1789.

In 1884, during Vietnam's Nguyễn dynasty, the Qing dynasty and France fought the Sino-French War, which ended in a Chinese defeat. The Treaty of Tientsin recognized French dominance in Vietnam and Indochina, spelling the end of formal Chinese influence on Vietnam and the beginning of Vietnam's French colonial period.

Both China and Vietnam faced invasion and occupation by Imperial Japan during World War II, and Vietnam languished under the rule of Vichy France. In the Chinese provinces of Guangxi and Guangdong, Vietnamese revolutionaries, led by Phan Bội Châu, had arranged alliances with the Chinese Nationalists, the Kuomintang, before the war by marrying Vietnamese women to Chinese National Revolutionary Army officers. Their children were at an advantage since they could speak both languages and so they worked as agents for the revolutionaries, spreading their ideologies across borders. The intermarriage between Chinese and Vietnamese was viewed with alarm by the French. Chinese merchants also married Vietnamese women and provided funds and help for revolutionary agents.

Late in the war, with Japan and Nazi Germany nearing defeat, US President Franklin Roosevelt privately decided that the French should not return in Indochina after the war was over. Roosevelt offered the Kuomintang leader, Chiang Kai-shek, all of Indochina to be under Chinese rule, but Chiang Kai-shek reportedly replied, "Under no circumstances!" In August 1943, China broke diplomatic relations with Vichy France, with the Central Daily News announcing that diplomatic relations were to be solely between the Chinese and the Vietnamese, with no French intermediary. China had planned to spread massive propaganda on the Atlantic Charter and Roosevelt's statement on Vietnamese self-determination to undermine the French authority in Indochina.

After the death of Franklin D. Roosevelt, however, his successor, Harry S. Truman, switched his position on Vietnamese independence to gain the support of Free French Forces in Europe.

According to a 2018 study in the Journal of Conflict Resolution on Vietnam-China relations from 1365 to 1841, they could be characterized as a "hierarchic tributary system" from 1365 to 1841. The study found that "the Vietnamese court explicitly recognized its unequal status in its relations with China through a number of institutions and norms. Vietnamese rulers also displayed very little military attention to their relations with China. Rather, Vietnamese leaders were clearly more concerned with quelling chronic domestic instability and managing relations with kingdoms to their south and west." However, decades of conflicts between China and Vietnam during the era, with Vietnamese attacks on China's allies, would challenge that claim.

Cold War
After the Second World War ended, a United Nations mandate, had 200,000 Chinese troops, led by General Lu Han, sent by Chiang Kai-shek to Indochina north of the 16th parallel with the aim of accepting the surrender of the Japanese occupying forces. The troops remained in Indochina until 1946. The Chinese used the Việt Nam Quốc Dân Đảng, the Vietnamese version of the Chinese Kuomintang, to increase their influence in Indochina and to put pressure on their opponents. Nevertheless, the Chinese occupation forces allowed Ho Chi Minh's Democratic Republic of Vietnam more influence than the British Army occupation authorities in the south. Chiang Kai-shek threatened the French with war to force them to negotiate with Ho Chi Minh. In February 1946, Chiang forced the French colonists to surrender all of their concessions in China and to renounce their extraterritorial privileges in exchange for withdrawing from northern Indochina and for allowing French troops to reoccupy the region.

Vietnam War
Along with the Soviet Union, Communist China was an important strategic ally of North Vietnam during the Indochina Wars. The Chinese Communist Party provided arms, military training and essential supplies to help the communist North defeat the imperialist French colonial empire, capitalist South Vietnam, and their ally the United States, between 1949 and 1975.  During 1964 to 1969, Communist China reportedly sent over 300,000 troops, mostly in anti-aircraft divisions to combat in Vietnam. However, the Vietnamese communists remained suspicious of China's perceived attempts to increase its influence over Vietnam. During the 1954 Geneva Conference ending the First Indochina War, Chinese Premier Zhou Enlai urged the Viet Minh delegation to accept partition at the 17th parallel, which was regarded as a betrayal.

Vietnam was an ideological battleground during the 1960s Sino-Soviet split. After the 1964 Gulf of Tonkin incident, Chinese Premier Deng Xiaoping secretly promised the North Vietnamese 1 billion yuan in military and economic aid if they refused all Soviet aid.

During the Vietnam War, the North Vietnamese and the Chinese had agreed to defer tackling their territorial issues until South Vietnam was defeated. Those issues included the lack of delineation of Vietnam's territorial waters in the Gulf of Tonkin and the question of sovereignty over the Paracel and Spratly Islands in the South China Sea. During the 1950s, half of the Paracels were controlled by China and the rest by South Vietnam. In 1958, North Vietnam accepted China's claim to the Paracels and relinquished its own claim; one year earlier, China had ceded White Dragon Tail Island to North Vietnam. The potential of offshore oil deposits in the Gulf of Tonkin heightened tensions between China and South Vietnam. In 1960, China became the first country to recognize the Viet Cong in Vietnam. In 1973, with the Vietnam War drawing to a close, North Vietnam announced its intention to allow foreign companies to explore oil deposits in disputed waters. In January 1974, a clash between Chinese and South Vietnamese forces resulted in China taking complete control of the Paracels. After its Fall of Saigon in 1975, North Vietnam took over the South Vietnamese-controlled portions of the Spratly Islands. The unified Vietnam then canceled its earlier renunciation of its claim to the Paracels, and both China and Vietnam claim control over all the Spratlys and actually control some of the islands. Vietnam was reunited in 1976.

Sino-Vietnamese conflicts 1979–1990 

In the wake of the Vietnam War, the Cambodian–Vietnamese War caused tensions with China, which had allied itself with Democratic Kampuchea. That and Vietnam's close ties to the Soviet Union made China consider Vietnam to be a threat to its regional sphere of influence. Tensions were heightened in the 1970s by the Vietnamese government's oppression of the Hoa minority (Vietnamese of Chinese ethnicity) and the invasion of Khmer Rouge-held Cambodia. At the same time, Vietnam expressed its disapproval with China strengthening ties with the United States since the Nixon-Mao Summit of 1972. By 1978, China ended its aid to Vietnam, which had signed a treaty of friendship with the Soviet Union and established extensive commercial and military ties.

On February 17, 1979, the Chinese People's Liberation Army crossed the Vietnamese border but withdrew on March 5, after a two-week campaign had devastated northern Vietnam and briefly threatened the Vietnamese capital, Hanoi. Both sides suffered relatively heavy losses, with thousands of casualties. Subsequent peace talks broke down in December 1979, and China and Vietnam began a major buildup of forces along the border. Vietnam fortified its border towns and districts and stationed as many as 600,000 troops. China stationed 400,000 troops on its side of the border. Sporadic fighting on the border occurred throughout the 1980s, and China threatened to launch another attack to force Vietnam's exit from Cambodia.

1990–present
With the 1991 dissolution of the Soviet Union and Vietnam's 1990 exit from Cambodia, China-Vietnamese ties began to improve. Both nations planned the normalization of their relations in a secret summit in Chengdu in September 1990, and officially normalized ties in November 1991. Since 1991, the leaders and high-ranking officials of both nations have exchanged visits. China and Vietnam both recognized and supported the post-1991 government of Cambodia, and supported each other's bid to join the World Trade Organization (WTO). In 1999, the General Secretary of the Communist Party of Vietnam, Le Kha Phieu, visited Beijing, where he met General Secretary of the Chinese Communist Party Jiang Zemin and announced a joint 16 Word Guideline for improved bilateral relations; a Joint Statement for Comprehensive Cooperation was issued in 2000. In 2000, Vietnam and China successfully resolved longstanding disputes over their land border and maritime rights in the Gulf of Tonkin, including the cession of land surrounding the Friendship Pass to China. A joint agreement between China and ASEAN in 2002 marked out a process of peaceful resolution and guarantees against armed conflict. In 2002, Jiang Zemin made an official visit to Vietnam in which numerous agreements were signed to expand trade and co-operation and to resolve outstanding disputes. In 2020, for the celebration of Vietnam's 75th National Day, General Secretary of the Chinese Communist Party Xi Jinping and his Vietnamese equal Nguyễn Phú Trọng reaffirmed their bilateral ties while looking back saying: "In the past 70 years, although there have been some ups and downs in bilateral relations, friendship and cooperation had always been the main flow."

Commercial ties

China is Vietnam's top trading partner, taking into account about 22.6% of the total exports values of Vietnam and 30% of imports of Vietnam.

After both sides resumed trade links in 1991, growth in annual bilateral trade increased from only US$32 million in 1991 to almost US$7.2 billion in 2004. By 2011, the trade volume had reached US$25 billion. In 2019, the total value of trade between the two countries amounted to US$517 billion. China's transformation into a major economic power in the 21st century has led to an increase of foreign investments in the bamboo network, a network of Overseas Chinese businesses operating in the markets of Southeast Asia that share common family and cultural ties.

Vietnam's exports to China include crude oil, coal, coffee, and food, and China exports pharmaceuticals, machinery, petroleum, fertilizers, and automobile parts to Vietnam. Both nations are working to establish an "economic corridor" from China's Yunnan Province to Vietnam's northern provinces and cities and similar economic zones linking China's Guangxi Province with Vietnam's Lạng Sơn and Quang Ninh Provinces, and the cities of Hanoi and Haiphong. Air and sea links and a railway line have been opened between the countries, along with national-level seaports in the frontier provinces and regions of the two countries. Joint ventures have furthermore been launched, such as the Thai Nguyen Steel Complex, but the deal eventually fell through, resulting in the bankruptcy of state-owned Thai Nguyen Iron and Steel VSC and the withdrawal of the China Metallurgical Group Corporation from the project.

Chinese investments in Vietnam have been rising since 2015, reaching US$2.17 billion in 2017. With the proposed Trans-Pacific Partnership, Vietnam was anticipated to offer more access to regional markets for Chinese affiliated firms.

In 2018, protesters went on the streets in Vietnam against government plans to open new special economic zones, including one in Quang Ninh, near the Chinese border, which would allow 99-year land leases, citing concerns about Chinese dominance.

Rekindled tensions over maritime territory

In June 2011, Vietnam announced that its military would conduct new exercises in the South China Sea. China had previously voiced its disagreement over Vietnamese oil exploration in the area, stating that the Spratly Islands and the surrounding waters were its sovereign territory. Defense of the South China Sea was cited as one of the possible missions of the first Chinese PLA Navy aircraft carrier, the Liaoning, which entered service in September 2012.

In October 2011, Nguyễn Phú Trọng, the General Secretary of the Communist Party of Vietnam, made an official visit to China at the invitation of General Secretary of the Chinese Communist Party Hu Jintao with the aim of improving relations in the wake of the border disputes. However, on 21 June 2012, Vietnam passed a law entitled the "Law on the Sea", which placed both the Spratly Islands and the Paracel Islands under Vietnamese jurisdiction, prompting China to label the move as "illegal and invalid." Simultaneously, China passed a law establishing the prefecture of Sansha City, which encompassed the Xisha (Paracel), Zhongsha, and Nansha (Spratly) Islands and the surrounding waters. Vietnam proceeded to a strong opposition to the measure and the reaffirmation of its sovereignty over the islands. Other countries surrounding the South China Sea have claims to the two island chains, including Taiwan, Brunei, Malaysia, and the Philippines, but the conflict remains predominantly between Vietnam and China.

On October 19, 2020, Japanese PM Yoshihide Suga visited his Vietnamese counterpart Nguyễn Xuân Phúc, and they agreed to cooperate on regional issues including the South China Sea, where China's growing assertiveness in disputed waters has drawn serious concern. Following Chinese Foreign Minister Wang Yi's high-profile visit to Vietnam in September 2021, where the Chinese foreign minister had avoided Vietnam for three years, Japanese Defense Minister Nobuo Kishi shortly followed up with his first visit overseas ever after Wang Yi's visit.  Nobuo Kishi signed an accord that Japanese-made defense equipment and technology are to be exported to the Southeast Asian country, and to boost cooperation amid worries of China's actions.

2013–2015 fishing and oil standoffs 

In May 2013 Vietnam accused China of hitting one of its fishing boats, and in May 2014, Vietnam accused China of ramming and sinking a fishing boat. Indeed, in recent years, Beijing oversaw the replacement of traditional Chinese wooden fishing vessels with steel-hulled trawlers, fitted with modern communication and high-tech navigation systems. The better-equipped boats sailed into the disputed waters as a state-subsidized operation to extend Chinese sovereignty, while in Vietnam, private citizens, not the government, would donate to Vietnamese fishermen to maintain their position in the South China Sea and to defend national sovereignty. That dynamic continues to be a major source of tension between the two countries.

In May 2014, both countries sparred over an oil rig in disputed territory in the South China Sea, which triggered deadly anti-Chinese protests in Vietnam. Rioters attacked hundreds of foreign-owned factories in an industrial park in southern Vietnam, targeting Chinese ones. In June China declared there would be no military conflict with Vietnam. China then had 71 ships in the disputed area, and Vietnam had 61.

However, on 2 June 2014, it was reported by VGP News, the online newspaper of the Vietnamese Government that the previous day, Chinese ships had in three waves attacked two Vietnam Coast Guard ships, a Vietnamese fisheries surveillance ship and a number of other ships by physically ramming the ships and with water cannons.

In 2015, the Council on Foreign Relations reported that the risk of a military confrontation between China and Vietnam was rising. In 2017, Beijing warned Hanoi that it would attack Vietnamese bases in the Spratly Islands if gas drilling continued in the area. Hanoi then ordered Spain's Repsol, whose subsidiary was conducting the drilling, to stop drilling.

2019–present: renewed tensions

Through 2019 and 2020, Chinese ships have continued attacking and sinking of Vietnamese fishing and other vessels in different incidents. Vietnam only reacted to these incidents by  official statements and diplomatic protests. In late 2020, Chinese Defense Minister Wei Fenghe met with Vietnamese ambassador to China Phạm Sao Mai in an attempt to cool down tensions after an increased number of incidents. The Vietnamese strategy on the South Chinese Sea disputes has been described as a long term consistent act of "balancing, international integration and 'cooperation and struggle'."

In May 2020, an Israeli cybersecurity company reported to have discovered ransomware attacks targeting government systems in Vietnam and several other countries by China-linked groups.

In August 2021 shortly before an expected visit by US Vice President Kamala Harris, Vietnamese Prime Minister Pham Minh Chinh reassured Xiong Bo, the Chinese envoy to Hanoi that Vietnam will not enter an alliance to counter China. Pham suggested the two nations should join with ASEAN to expedite "the slow-moving negotiations" and achieve a code of conduct in the disputed South China Sea region and that his country wanted to build political trust, cooperation and promote exchange with China. Xiong stated in the meeting that the two communist nations shared the same political system and beliefs and that China was willing to work with Vietnam and stick to the two countries’ high-level strategic directive to further develop ties. Xiong also requested for Vietnam's support in opposing what China claims as “politicisation” of COVID-19 origin investigations.

COVID-19 pandemic

In 2020, Bloomberg News reported that a hacker group known as APT32 or OceanLotus, allegedly affiliated with the Vietnamese government, had targeted China's Ministry of Emergency Management and the Wuhan municipal government in order to obtain information about the COVID-19 pandemic. The Vietnamese Ministry of Foreign Affairs called the accusations unfounded.

Illegal border crossings by Chinese nationals was linked by the Vietnamese public as the perceived cause of new COVID-19 infections in Vietnam, although there had been no evidence for this.

Diplomatic missions

Vietnamese missions in China
Beijing (embassy)
Guangzhou (consulate)
Kunming (consulate)
Nanning (consulate)
Shanghai (consulate)

Chinese missions in Vietnam
Hanoi (embassy)
Ho Chi Minh City (consulate)
Da Nang (consulate)

See also
List of ambassadors of China to Vietnam
List of ambassadors of Vietnam to China
History of China
History of Vietnam
Sinicization
Anti-Chinese sentiments
Anti-Vietnamese sentiments
Sino-Vietnamese Wars
China–Vietnam border

References

Bibliography

 Amer, Ramses. "China, Vietnam, and the South China Sea: disputes and dispute management." Ocean Development & International Law 45.1 (2014): 17–40.
 Ang, Cheng Guan. Southeast Asia's cold war: An interpretive history (U  of Hawaii Press, 2018) online review.
 Ang, Cheng Guan.  Vietnamese Communist Relations with China and the Second Indo-China Conflict, 1956-1962 (MacFarland, 1997).
 Ang, Cheng Guan. Southeast Asia after the Cold War: A Contemporary History (Singapore: NUS Press, 2019).
 Blazevic, Jason J. "Navigating the security dilemma: China, Vietnam, and the South China Sea." Journal of Current Southeast Asian Affairs 31.4 (2012): 79–108. online
 Brook, Timothy, Michael van Walt van Praag, and Miek Boltjes, eds. Sacred mandates: Asian international relations since Chinggis Khan (University of Chicago Press, 2018).
 Chakraborti, Tridib. "China and Vietnam in the South China Sea Dispute: A Creeping ‘Conflict–Peace–Trepidation’Syndrome." China Report 48.3 (2012): 283–301. online
 Chen, King C. Vietnam and China, 1938-1954 (Princeton University Press, 2015). excerpt
 Cuong, Nguyen Xuan, and Nguyen Thi Phuong Hoa. "Achievements and Problems in Vietnam: China Relations from 1991 to the Present." China Report 54.3 (2018): 306–324. online
 Fravel, M. Taylor. Active Defense: China's Military Strategy Since 1949 (Princeton UP, 2019).
 Ha, Lam Thanh, and Nguyen Duc Phuc. "The US-China Trade War: Impact on Vietnam." (2019). online
 Han, Xiaorong. "Exiled to the ancestral land: The resettlement, stratification and assimilation of the refugees from Vietnam in China." International Journal of Asian Studies 10.1 (2013): 25–46.
 Kang, David C., et al. "War, rebellion, and intervention under hierarchy: Vietnam–China relations, 1365 to 1841." Journal of Conflict Resolution 63.4 (2019): 896–922. online
 Khoo, Nicholas. "Revisiting the Termination of the Sino–Vietnamese Alliance, 1975–1979." European Journal of East Asian Studies 9.2 (2010): 321–361. online
 Kurlantzick, Joshua. China-Vietnam Military Clash (Washington: Council on Foreign Relations, 2015). online

 Liegl, Markus B. China's use of military force in foreign affairs: The dragon strikes (Taylor & Francis, 2017). excerpt
 Nguyen, Anh Ngoc. "Three Structures of Vietnam-China Relations: a View from the Structural Constructivist Theory." East Asia 38.2 (2021): 123–138. online
 Nguyen, Hanh Thi My. "Application of Center-Periphery Theory to the Study of Vietnam-China Relations in the Middle Ages." Southeast Asian Studies 8.1 (2019): 53–79. online
 Path, Kosal. "China's Economic Sanctions against Vietnam, 1975-1978." China Quarterly (2012)  Vol. 212, pp 1040–1058.
 Path, Kosal. "The economic factor in the Sino-Vietnamese split, 1972–75: an analysis of Vietnamese archival sources." Cold War History 11.4 (2011): 519–555.
 Path, Kosal. "The Sino-Vietnamese Dispute over Territorial Claims, 1974-1978: Vietnamese Nationalism and its Consequences." International Journal of Asian Studies 8.2 (2011): 189–220. online
Taylor, K. W. A History of the Vietnamese (Cambridge University Press, 2013). . 
 Wills, Jr., John E. “Functional, Not Fossilized: Qing Tribute Relations with Đại Việt (Vietnam) and Siam (Thailand), 1700–1820,” T'oung Pao, Vol. 98 Issue 4–5, (2012), 439–47
 Zhang, Xiaoming. Deng Xiaoping's Long War: The Military Conflict Between China and Vietnam, 1979-1991 (U of North Carolina Press  2015) excerpt
 Zhang, Xiaoming. "Deng Xiaoping and China's Decision to go to War with Vietnam." Journal of Cold War Studies 12.3 (2010): 3-29 online
 Zhang, Xiaoming. "China's 1979 war with Vietnam: a reassessment." China Quarterly (2005): 851–874. online

External links
Chinese embassy in Vietnam 
Vietnamese embassy in Beijing, China 

 
Bilateral relations of Vietnam
Vietnam
Economy of Yunnan
Relations of colonizer and former colony